The Mitsubishi Pajero Sport is a mid-size SUV produced by the Japanese manufacturer Mitsubishi Motors using the Pajero nameplate since 1996 that has spanned over three generations and based on the Triton pickup truck. Mitsubishi has formerly used the  name in Japan and some international markets, but since the third generation, the Pajero Sport/Montero Sport/Shogun Sport was the name used instead.



First generation (K80/K90/PA/PA II; 1996) 

Production began in Japan in 1996, and was available for most export markets by 1997, where it was variously known as the Challenger, Pajero Sport in Europe, Montero Sport in North America, South America , Spain and the Philippines, Nativa in parts of Latin America, the Caribbean and the Middle East, Shogun Sport in the United Kingdom, and Strada G-Wagon in Thailand. Based on the Strada pickup truck of the same vintage, sharing many components and some body panels (i.e. front doors), the first-generation Challenger was also built on the second-generation Pajero wheelbase, and served as a smaller model to the larger Pajero.

Like the Pajero, it featured independent front suspension with torsion bars and a live rear axle. In addition to numerous facelifts over the years, there was a major suspension change from rear leaf to coil springs in late 2000. As its popularity increased, local assembly for foreign markets was introduced in China in 2003, and Brazil in 2006. Sales were discontinued in Japan in 2003, in North America in 2004 (excluding Canada) where it was sold alongside the Endeavor, where it was superseded by the Endeavor, and central and western Europe in 2008. In Japan, it was sold at a specific retail chain called Car Plaza.

The 3-liter V6 is the most commonly used engine; it produces  at 5,000 rpm. The North American market received petrol V6 engines during all years of production while a petrol 2.4-liter engine was offered on base models from 1997 through 1999 in the United States and for additional years in Canada. Markets outside of North America also had a variety of turbo-diesel four-cylinder engines to choose between.

Gallery

Second generation (KG/KH/PB; 2008) 

The second-generation of the vehicle, based on the ladder frame chassis of the Triton, was gradually introduced to selected markets (Russia, Southeast Asia and the Middle East) through the autumn of 2008, following its debut at the Moscow International Automobile Salon. The design is partially influenced from the 4.7-litre V8 powered 2001 Pajero Evolution concept car. 2.5- or 3.2-litre diesel and 3.0- or 3.5-litre V6 petrol engines are available as before, while five- or seven-seat interior configurations are offered. As with the Triton pickup on which it is based, production of the new Pajero Sport for all markets is concentrated in Thailand.

In the Philippines and Mexico, the Pajero Sport is officially named as Montero Sport. The Montero Sport mainly competes with the Toyota Fortuner and Chevrolet Trailblazer in the Philippines and several other markets.

In India, the Pajero Sport was imported in CKD kits, and assembled by Hindustan Motors-Mitsubishi joint venture. It is equipped with a 4D56-T 2.5-litre turbo-diesel. It was discontinued in 2019.

In Bangladesh, the Pajero Sport is assembled by state-owned automotive industry Pragoti.

The car has a leather interior, with a screen at the front dashboard that includes a clock, compass, fuel economy monitor, and more features. The 2nd row has individual air conditioning vents, and a control panel to control the air conditioning for the rear seats. The 3rd row comes with 2 cup holders and a power outlet.

Sudden unintended acceleration issue 

In 2011, Montero Sport owners in the Philippines reported that their vehicles suffered from sudden unintended acceleration. Mitsubishi Motors Philippines later responded with a statement saying that they conducted tests on the Montero Sport's electrical systems and found no problems; furthermore, they stated that the accidents related to the issue were more likely caused by human error. Owners of Montero Sport affected by the sudden unintended acceleration issue plan to file a class action lawsuit against Mitsubishi Motors Philippines. The Department of Trade and Industry (DTI) opened an investigation panel to probe the accidents and complaints from 2010 to 2015, and will recommend either a product recall or a total sales ban on the Montero Sport in the country.

Third generation (KR/KS/QE/QF; 2015) 

On 1 August 2015, Mitsubishi Motors unveiled the third-generation Pajero Sport in Thailand and would be released as the 2016 model and would be powered by the new 4N15 2.4L MIVEC engine. Since the third-generation model was unveiled, it has no longer used the Challenger name, and used Pajero Sport/Montero Sport name instead.

One of the highlighted features of the third-generation Pajero Sport is the Toyota-derived Aisin TL-80SN/TL-80NF 8-speed automatic transmission replacing the predecessor's 5-speed INVECS-II automatic. It vastly improves fuel efficiency compared to the 5-speed without sacrificing in-gear acceleration. The Pajero Sport is also available with a 6-speed manual for some variants. All variants come with 6" two-piston ventilated disc brakes in the front and 6” solid disc brakes in the rear and Mitsubishi's S-AWC all-wheel drive system for 4x4 variants. Other features include a sunroof, dual-zone climate control system, power-adjustable leather-contoured seats with multi-layer cushioning, optional 7-seating capacity (vary by market), and a 7-inch infotainment system.

It is also has a lighter body compared to the predecessor because of the usage of CF plastics which are tough and lightweight and with the help of the 4N15 lightweight alloy block, the whole body has a low center of gravity.

For the Indonesian market, the third-generation Pajero Sport was launched on 29 January 2016 in Jakarta. It was initially built in and imported from Thailand. Since April 2017, it is built and assembled at the Cikarang plant in Bekasi, West Java.

The Pajero Sport/Montero Sport has three engine options.

In the Philippines, it is marketed as the Montero Sport. As a mass market vehicle, it has added a lot of features compared to its predecessor. The Montero Sport is available in 4 variants: GLX 4x2 (6-speed manual), GLS 4x2 (8-speed automatic), Black Series 4x2 (8-speed automatic), and GT 4x4 (8-speed automatic). All variants are powered by the 2.4L 4N15 MIVEC VGT clean diesel engine.

In Bangladesh, it is marketed as the Pajero Sport and assembled by Pragoti in Chittagong. It also manufactured the car.

In the Middle East, it is available with a 6B31 3.0 V6 petrol version.

In Australia, the Pajero Sport is available as a five-seater for the base model GLX or GLS variant or a seven-seater in the GLS and Exceed. The Pajero Sport only comes in an automatic transmission due to low sales of the manual transmission in the previous generation.

In the United Kingdom, the Pajero Sport was released as the Shogun Sport and it is also available as a commercial variant without the second- and third-row seats.

Facelift (QF) 
The facelifted third-generation Pajero Sport was launched in Thailand on 25 July 2019. The updated Pajero Sport gets a new front fascia with dual-layer headlight configuration. Tail lights were made shorter, following customer feedback. Engine and transmission remained the same as the outgoing model. Other notable improvements including Auto Hold parking brake, a new 8-inch digital instrument cluster and an 8-inch infotainment system with navigation, 360-degree surround cameras and support for Apple CarPlay and Android Auto, and hands-free powered tailgate. It was released to overseas markets from October 2019, including Indonesia on 16 February 2021.

Safety 
The Thai-made Montero Sport in its most basic Latin American configuration received 5 stars for adult occupants and 3 stars for toddlers from Latin NCAP in 2015.

Annual production 

(Sources: Facts & Figures 2000, Facts & Figures 2005, Facts & Figures 2008, Facts & Figures 2010, Facts & Figures 2013, Facts & Figures 2018, Facts & Figures 2019, Mitsubishi Motors website)

Sales

References

External links 

Mitsubishi Pajero Sport website (global)

Pajero Sport
Cars introduced in 1996
2000s cars
2010s cars
2020s cars
Mid-size sport utility vehicles
Rear-wheel-drive vehicles
All-wheel-drive vehicles
Latin NCAP large off-road
Cars powered by longitudinal 4-cylinder engines